Winkle Island is the island lying between Tula Point and Pickwick Island, Pitt Islands, in the Biscoe Islands.  It is separated from Renaud Island to the southwest by Mraka Sound.

The island was shown on an Argentine government chart of 1957.  It was named by the UK-APC in 1959 after Nathaniel Winkle, a member of the Pickwick Club in Charles Dickens' Pickwick Papers.

Location

British mapping in 1971.

Maps
 British Antarctic Territory: Graham Coast.  Scale 1:200000 topographic map.  DOS 610 Series, Sheet W 65 64.  Directorate of Overseas Surveys, UK, 1971.
 Antarctic Digital Database (ADD). Scale 1:250000 topographic map of Antarctica. Scientific Committee on Antarctic Research (SCAR). Since 1993, regularly upgraded and updated.

References
 Winkle Island. SCAR Composite Antarctic Gazetteer.

Islands of the Biscoe Islands